Survivor: Heroes vs. Healers vs. Hustlers is the 35th season of the American CBS competitive reality television series Survivor. This season featured 18 new players divided into three tribes based on a dominant perceived trait: "Heroes" (courage), "Healers" (compassion), and "Hustlers" (tenacity). The season premiered on September 27, 2017, and ended on December 20, 2017, when Ben Driebergen was named the winner over Chrissy Hofbeck and Ryan Ulrich in a 5–2–1 vote.

This season featured several alterations to the rules. This season marked a return to the tiebreaker format used before the previous season, Survivor: Game Changers, where a tied vote at Tribal Council was followed by a second ballot before being declared "deadlocked". The format of the penultimate Tribal Council, with four players remaining, was changed; in lieu of a vote, the winner of the final immunity challenge was to assign additional immunity to another castaway, with the remaining two competing in a fire-making challenge to determine the third finalist. This was the fourth season of the show filmed in Fiji (tied with Nicaragua, the Philippines and Samoa), following Survivor: Fiji, Survivor: Millennials vs. Gen X, and Survivor: Game Changers.

Contestants

The cast is composed of 18 new players, initially split into three tribes containing six members each; Levu ("Heroes"), Soko ("Healers"), and Yawa ("Hustlers"). Notable contestants include former beauty queen Desiree "Desi" Williams, Olympian Katrina Radke and football player Alan Ball.

Future appearances
Ben Driebergen returned to compete on Survivor: Winners at War.

In 2022, Ben Driebergen and Desi Williams competed on The Challenge: USA.

Season summary
The 18 players were initially divided into three tribes: Levu (Heroes), Soko (Healers) and Yawa (Hustlers). During the marooning, Ryan from the Hustlers tribe found a Super Immunity Idol that was only valid at the first Tribal Council. As his tribe won immunity, he was able to send the Idol to a member of the losing Heroes tribe; he chose Chrissy. Ryan and Chrissy both became dominant players on their tribes, forming strong alliances with Devon and Ben, respectively. The Healers tribe went undefeated, while the Heroes lost one member and the Hustlers lost two.

When the tribes were switched, Ryan and Chrissy aligned on the new Soko tribe, working to eliminate Healers and their allies, including Ryan's former Hustlers tribemate Ali. At the merge, Ryan and Chrissy brought their former Heroes and Hustlers tribemates together against the Healers. Ryan and Chrissy's allies eventually turned on them, with Ben acting as a double agent to hinder their plans, but Ben's new alliance also betrayed him for being a threat to win the game. However, he managed to successfully play three consecutive hidden immunity idols to reach the final four along with Chrissy, Ryan and Devon.

When Chrissy won the final immunity challenge, she had to grant one castaway additional immunity, which would force the remaining two to compete against each other in a fire-making challenge to determine the third finalist. She chose to save Ryan. Ben defeated Devon in the firemaking challenge to join Chrissy and Ryan in the finals.  At the Final Tribal Council, Ben was praised for finding multiple hidden immunity idols and making it to the end despite being a massive target while Chrissy was commended for dominating in immunity challenges, but both were criticized for their lack of social connections, while Ryan was criticized for his lack of strategic conversations and work ethic. Ultimately, Ben was awarded the title of Sole Survivor over Chrissy and Ryan in a 5–2–1 vote.

Episodes

Voting history

Notes

Reception and ratings
The September 27 premiere episode, titled "I'm Not Crazy, I'm Confident" saw a significant boost in viewership over March's Survivor: Game Changers with 8.33 million people tuning in, compared to the show's all-time low of 7.64 earlier in the year. However, the premiere of the show's 35th season was unable to match Survivor: Millennials vs. Gen X's premiere viewership from fall 2016. That said, the series once again ranked first in its time-slot (by a significant margin) and once again tied with ABC's The Goldbergs for the critical 18-49 demographic, with both placing behind Fox's Empire.

The season itself had mixed response, garnering praise for the likable cast, entertaining tribal councils, and the gameplay of the Final 7. However, the new Final Four Twist was mostly panned by critics. After winning the final immunity challenge, Chrissy Hofbeck was awarded an advantage to be used at the following Tribal Council. She learned that in place of the conventional Day 38 final vote-off, she had to select one contestant to join her in the Final Tribal Council, while the remaining two contestants would be forced in a fire-making challenge to determine the third finalist. Due to the inclusion of this twist, contestant Ben Driebergen, who was virtually guaranteed to be voted out without immunity, was allowed one final chance of avoiding elimination. Subsequently, he went on to win the challenge and advance to the Final Tribal Council, where he then went on to win the season.

Alyssa Norwin of Hollywood Life said that the twist undermined the significance of winning the final immunity challenge. People Magazine blogger Stephen Fishbach, who played in Survivor: Tocantins and Survivor: Cambodia, tweeted that it removed fundamental social strategy from the game. Survivor: Millennials vs. Gen X winner Adam Klein commented, "Super happy for the winner who played their heart out!! That being said, if that twist happened in my season, I would have come in 4th most likely. Players should be able to plan out their own endgame and know the basic format of the game they play."

Host and Executive Producer Jeff Probst ultimately confirmed that, while the twist itself was not implemented in the game to specifically benefit Ben, its main goal was to prevent contestants like him from being eliminated one step away from the Final Tribal Council, simply for being a threat to win the game. The twist, Probst said, gives these types of players one last chance to survive instead of just being unanimously voted out by the others.

Dalton Ross of Entertainment Weekly ranked this season 24th criticizing both the underwhelming start to the season and the fire-making twist. In 2020, Survivor fan site "Purple Rock Podcast" ranked this season 33rd saying that "cast is at least pleasant, and at one point in the season there is actually a shockingly strong strategic play" but this season is one that "you'll likely forget completely soon after watching it". Later that same year, Inside Survivor ranked this season 28th out of 40 saying that it has "aged better than its surrounding seasons, and that's due to a pretty strong cast, who may be better remembered if the endgame had played out differently."

In 2021, Rob Has a Podcast ranked Heroes vs. Healers vs. Hustlers 33rd during their Survivor All-Time Top 40 Rankings podcast.

U.S. Nielsen ratings

References

External links
 Official CBS Survivor website

2017 American television seasons
2017 in Fiji
34
Television shows filmed in Fiji
Television shows set in Fiji